Graham Bray (born 10 April 1953) is an English former professional rugby league footballer who played in the 1970s and 1980s.

Playing career
Graham Bray was born in Doncaster, West Riding of Yorkshire, England.

Playing career
Bray made his début for Featherstone Rovers on Saturday 1 January 1972, he had played 16-matches for Featherstone Rovers who went on to be League Leaders in the Championship during the 1976–77 season, when in January 1977, midway through the season, he transferred to Hull F.C. who went on to be League Leaders in the Second Division, he is therefore one of only a few (only?) players to have won both a Championship, and Second Division winners medal in the same season, he scored 21-tries for Hull F.C. in the 1978–79 season, that season being the second-highest try-scorer for Hull F.C. (behind Paul Prendiville with 25-tries), and the ninth-highest try-scorer in the league, he played his last match for Hull F.C. during the 1988–81 season.

Challenge Cup Final appearances
Bray played , i.e. number 5, in Featherstone Rovers' 9-24 defeat by Warrington in the 1974 Challenge Cup Final during the 1973–74 season at Wembley Stadium, London on Saturday 11 May 1974, in front of a crowd of 77,400, and played , i.e. number 2, in Hull FC's 5-10 defeat by Hull Kingston Rovers in the 1980 Challenge Cup Final during the 1979–80 season at Wembley Stadium, London on Saturday 3 May 1980, in front of a crowd of 95,000.

County Cup Final appearances
Bray played , i.e. number 2, and scored a try in Featherstone Rovers' 12-16 defeat by Leeds in the 1976 Yorkshire County Cup Final during the 1976–77 season at Headingley Rugby Stadium, Leeds on Saturday 16 October 1976.

BBC2 Floodlit Trophy Final appearances
Bray played , i.e. number 2, in Hull FC's 13-3 victory over Hull Kingston Rovers in the 1979 BBC2 Floodlit Trophy Final during the 1979-80 season at The Boulevard, Kingston upon Hull on Tuesday 18 December 1979.

References

1953 births
Living people
English rugby league players
Featherstone Rovers players
Hull F.C. players
Rugby league players from Doncaster
Rugby league wingers